Jēkabs Peterss (Yakov Khristoforovich Peters, ;  – 25 April 1938) was a Latvian Communist revolutionary who played a part in the establishment of the Soviet Union. Together with Felix Dzerzhinsky, he was one of the founders and chiefs of the Cheka, the secret police of the Soviet Russia. He was the Deputy Chairman of the Cheka from 1918 and briefly the acting Chairman of the Cheka from 7 July to 22 August 1918.

Early years
He was born on 3 December 1886 in Brinken volost of Kreis Hasenpoth, Courland Governorate (now Nīkrāce parish, Skrunda Municipality), the son of Latvian farmers. He became a member of the Latvian Social Democratic Workers' Party in 1904. In the aftermath of the Russian Revolution of 1905 he was arrested in March 1907 for the attempted murder of a factory director in Libau, but was later acquitted by the Riga military court in 1908. Peterss emigrated to England and lived in London where he was a member of the London Group of the Social Democracy of Latvia and of the British Socialist Party.

The Siege of Sidney Street 
Peterss was a first cousin of Fritz Svaars, a Latvian anarchist, who was suspected of sabotage, robbery and of the murders of a shopkeeper and a policeman during the 1905 revolution, and was arrested and tortured in Riga, but escaped early in 1906. He moved to London, and was one of a gang who tried to rob a jeweler's shop in Houndsditch, in December 1910. Caught in the act, they killed three unarmed police officers. Svaars and a fellow anarchist were traced to a house in Sidney Street in January 1911, and opened fire on the police, setting off the Siege of Sidney Street which ended with the deaths of both suspects. Peterss was arrested at his home in Turner Street, London, on 22 December. Unlike his cousin, he did not attempt to resist arrest. In May 1911, he and three other Latvian emigres were tried in the Old Bailey. The judge ordered the jury to acquit Peterss on the charge of murder, for lack of evidence. After he had given evidence under cross-examination, he was acquitted of the separate charge of conspiring to commit a burglary.

Family 
In 1916, he married May Freeman, the daughter of a London banker, by whom he had already fathered a daughter, Maisie Peters-Freeman (born 1914). After the Russian revolution, he invited his wife and daughter to join him there, where they discovered that he had a new family. Maisie was never able to leave Russia and died there in 1971.

October Revolution
Peterss returned to Russia in May 1917 after the February Revolution. In Riga, Peterss became one of the leaders of the Social Democracy of Latvia working at the front-lines of the Northern Front. During the German advance he moved to Valmiera where he was an editor of the party newspaper Cīņa. Peterss was a peasant representative of the Governorate of Livonia to the Democratic discussion initiated by Kerensky.

Moving to Petrograd, he actively participated in the Bolshevik revolution of October 1917 being a member of the Military-Revolutionary Committee in Petrograd. At that time he was preparing military units for the October Revolution. Afterward, he was a member of Cheka Collegiate, the Deputy Chairman of the Commission, and the chairman of the Revolutionary Tribunal. He participated in the disclosure of the alleged Lockhart plot as well as leading the liquidation of the Left SR mutiny of 1918. Following Dzerzhinsky's resignation in the aftermath of the Left SR Uprising, assassination of Mirbach, and the Treaty of Brest-Litovsk, Peterss briefly served as the chief of the Cheka until Dzerzhinsky resumed his duties. As one of the Cheka's leaders, Peterss was responsible for the first major Cheka operations involving killings. These were against alleged anarchists in Petrograd and later in May 1918 against anarchists in Petrograd and Moscow. He also was involved in the investigation of the SR attempt on Lenin's life in August 1918 (Fanni Kaplan case), for the indiscriminate Red Terror campaigns and reprisals that followed. He called it a "Hysterical Terror" in the newspaper "Utro Moskvy" (#21) of November 4, 1918. During these times appeared a term "room of souls" in numerous prisons such as Butyrka.

In March 1919 he was appointed as the Chief of internal defense in Petrograd, and then the Commandant of the reinforced raion. Following the retreat of the Yudenich forces he was appointed as the Commandant of the reinforced raion in Kiev in August 1919. Upon the sack of Kiev he was a member of the Military Council in Tula. In winter 1919–20 Peters became the deputy chairman of the Special Committee of the STO in providing military preparations on railways.

Post-revolution
In 1920, he represented the Cheka in the Northern Caucasus and served there as the Commissar of the Northern Caucasus Railways. In 1920–1922, he was the Cheka plenipotentiary in Turkestan ASSR, where he also was the local party bureau member. There he led numerous operations against the anti-Bolshevik formations of Dutov, Annenkov, Enver Pasha  and Dzhanuzakov. He returned to Moscow in 1922 and worked as a high-ranking official in the OGPU, Rabkrin, and as the chief of the Eastern department of the GPU (created on June 2, 1922).

During the Great Purge, as a part of the so-called "Latvian Operation", Peterss was arrested and executed by the NKVD on April 25, 1938, at the Kommunarka shooting ground. He was posthumously rehabilitated in 1956.

Reputation 
In 1919, an American diplomat testified to Congress that Peterss was, with another Cheka leader Aleksandr Eiduk, considered the "most blood-thirsty monster in Russia". At that time, Peterss' influence was vastly overstated by English language newspapers, because he was known to the police in the UK, and because he was the only one of the founders of Cheka who spoke English. On 25 January 1919, The Times in London belatedly learnt that the Bolsheviks had been divided over whether to conduct a revolutionary war with Germany, and claimed that One party is headed by Lenin, the other by Trotsky, Peterss, Radek and Zinovieff...The Trotsky and Peters party believe in heroic measures..." Peterss did not merit a mention in any of Trotsky's extensive writings about the period, and certainly was not in the front ranks of the Bolsheviks leadership.  As a Chekist, he undoubtedly had many people killed, yet the portrayal of him as 'the most blood-thirsty monster' contrasts with the opinion of the British diplomat, Robert Bruce Lockhart, who spent a month under arrest in Moscow in 1918 and was interrogated by Peterss. Bruce Lockhart wrote:

See also
Peter the Painter, a possible alternate identity of Peterss' while in England.

References

Further reading
 Bibliography of the Russian Revolution and Civil War
 Bibliography of Stalinism and the Soviet Union

External links
Biography of Peters 

1886 births
1938 deaths
Cheka officers
British Socialist Party members
Cheka
Great Purge victims from Latvia
Latvian communists
Latvian revolutionaries
Old Bolsheviks
People from Courland Governorate
People from Skrunda Municipality
Soviet rehabilitations